Digitec Galaxus AG is the biggest online retailer in Switzerland. It operates the digitec and Galaxus online shops as well as ten stores in the German and French speaking parts of Switzerland.

Revenue 
In January 2020, Digitec Galaxus AG reported a revenue growth of 16%, increasing it to 1.146 billion Swiss francs. (2018, 992 million Swiss francs. 2017: 861 million Swiss francs, 2016: 725 million Swiss francs.)

Product range 
Digitec Galaxus AG showcased more than a million products in its range (in January 2018).

While the Galaxus online platform stocks the full Digitec Galaxus AG range, Digitec specializes in consumer electronics.

The Swiss online retailer operates the following categories: «Home», «Interior», «DIY + Garden», «Sports + Leisure», «Toys», «Pet Supplies», «Baby + Child», «Health + Beauty», «Watches + Jewelry», «Office», «Media and Digital». (in January 2018).

Since October 2016, Galaxus has been using a marketplace model that allows external retailers to sell their products via galaxus.ch. External retailers include Qualipet and the Swiss department store Globus.

Stores and collection options 
Digitec Galaxus AG has ten stores in German and French speaking parts of Switzerland. These stores act as showrooms, collection and return points for products as well as places to purchase and ask questions about them. Therefore, the company is not purely an online retailer. Digitec Galaxus AG follows an approach that is known as a multichannel or omnichannel strategy in the industry.

The company has stores in Basel, Bern, Dietikon, Geneva, Kriens, Lausanne, St. Gallen, Winterthur, Wohlen (AG) and Zurich.

The Migros pickup-service PickMup with its hundreds of locations is also available for Digitec and Galaxus clients.

Logistics and delivery 
Digitec Galaxus has its own warehouse in Wohlen (AG). The building was last expanded in September 2017 when it was also partly automated. It now spans 46,500 square meters. The warehouse hosts more than 100 kilometers of shelving for up to 1,5 million products.

More than 300 members of staff work in the Digitec Galaxus logistics department (as at September 2017).

The company works with Swiss Post to coordinate deliveries.

Digitec Galaxus delivers to customers in Switzerland and Liechtenstein.

When a customer places an order before 7 p.m. (Monday to Friday) for a product that is in stock at the Digitec Galaxus warehouse, it is sent out the same day. This means it should reach the customer the following morning (except on Sundays). The website shows availability for each product in real time.

History 
Digitec was launched in April 2001 by the three young entrepreneurs Oliver Nägeli (now Oliver Herren), Florian Teuteberg and Marcel Dobler under the name Nägeli Trading & Co.

On 13 June 2005, they converted the company into an Aktiengesellschaft (corporation). The business then traded under the name Digitec AG until 2014. (The official spelling is digitec AG with a lower-case 'd'.)

Fast-forward to May 2012 and Digitec AG was taking its Galaxus e-commerce site online to expand its product range beyond consumer electronics. Extending their product line to include day-to-day items was the company's response to shrinking margins and meagre growth in the electronics trade.

In June 2012, Migros acquired a 30% share in Digitec for an estimated 42 million Swiss francs. And since 2015, Migros has been a majority shareholder in Galaxus AG with a stake of 70%.

Meanwhile, August 2014 saw the relaunch of the company's website after going through a public test phase as Digitec beta. And the underlying ERP was developed in-house. There used to be a highly modified access database handling goods management. However, sheer growth stretched this to its limits.

On 2 September 2014, Digitec AG changed its name to Galaxus (Schweiz) AG. And on 28 July 2015, Digitec Galaxus AG was born, thereby making a clear link between the two brands digitec and Galaxus.

In April 2017, Digitec Galaxus AG started focusing on gamification, making it the first Swiss online retailer to do so.

As of August 2017, Digitec Galaxus AG extended the time customers have to return products from 14 to 30 days.

Meanwhile, September 2017 saw Digitec Galaxus AG decide to expand its warehouse.

October 2017 marked a milestone for the company when it was announced Galaxus would be expanding to Germany in 2018. The exact launch date has not yet been confirmed. This move ensures the company has access to the Digital Single Market. If Digitec Galaxus AG has success in Germany, it intends to expand to other countries.

In November 2017, the company launched a recommerce feature. This allows customers to resell products purchased from Digitec Galaxus products through Digitec Galaxus.

In January 2018, Galaxus.ch featured approximately 24,000 Globus products on its e-commerce site. Thanks to the new Globus department, Galaxus now has exceeded the million mark in the number of products in its range.

In November 2018, Galaxus announced the launch of its German online shop galaxus.de.

In March 2019, the company announced that its digitec and Galaxus sites would now accept 10 different types of cryptocurrency including Bitcoin, Bitcoin Cash, Ethereum and Bitcoin SV as payment for purchases totalling more than 200 Swiss francs. Co-founder Oliver Herren called cryptocurrencies "fascinating" and said Digitec Galaxus "want to support" the development of the new technology.

2021 Galaxus expanded to Austria, www.galaxus.at started in November.

In 2022, a new warehouse with almost four times the storage area is to be opened at the logistics site in Krefeld.

Awards 
 Digital Commerce Champion 2018
Swiss Poster Award 2017 in the category "Commercial National"
 Digital Marketer of the Year 2018
 Swiss Marketing Society (GfM) marketing prize 2017
 Swiss E-Commerce Award 2017
 Galaxus: Swiss E-Commerce Champion 2017
 Galaxus: Winner of the B2C - Home & Living category
 Galaxus: Winner of the Curation, Social and Content Commerce category
 Best of Swiss Web Award 2015: Swiss Web Award
 Third place in the SVC enterprise award 2011 for Zurich
 Swiss Economic Award 2008

References

External links 
  digitec.ch
  galaxus.ch

Retail companies established in 2001
Retail companies of Switzerland
Companies based in Zürich
Migros
Video game retailers
Swiss companies established in 2001